Sheema, also Sheema Municipality, is an urban centre in the Western Region of Uganda. It is the largest municipality in Sheema District.

Location
The coordinates of the town are:0°34'52.0"S, 30°22'46.0"E (Latitude:-0.581111; Longitude).

Overview
Sheema Municipality, is an urban centre in Sheema District. It includes the neighborhoods of Kabwohe, Itendero and Kibingo, where the district headquarters are located. Sheema Town was created on 1 July 2018, by carving it out of Sheema North Constituency.

Population
In 2014 the national census put the population of Sheema Municipality (Kibingo-Kabwohe-Itendero), at 80,735 people.

Points of interest
The following points of interest lie within the town limits or close to the edges of town: (a) The offices of Sheema Town Council (b) Kabwohe Central Market, the largest source of fresh produce in Kabwohe (c) A branch of Stanbic Bank Uganda Limited (d) A branch of Pride Microfinance Limited (e) Emmanuel Church, Kabwohe, a place of worship affiliated with the Church of Uganda (e) The headquarters of Sheema District (f) Ankole Western University, a private university affiliated with Western Ankole Diocese of the Church of Uganda. (g) Nganwa High School, a secondary school administered by the Uganda Ministry of Education (h) Integrated Community Based Initiatives (ICOBI), an NGO in Kabwohe and (i) Kabwohe Clinical Research Center (KCRC), a research, development, and medical testing center.

See also

References

External links
 About Ankole Western University

Populated places in Western Region, Uganda
Cities in the Great Rift Valley
Sheema District
Ankole sub-region